Tauren Chasmaine Poole (born October 19, 1989) is a former American football running back. He played college football at Tennessee.

College career
Poole attended University of Tennessee from 2008 to 2011 under head coaches Phillip Fulmer, Lane Kiffin, and Derek Dooley. During his career, he rushed for 1,898 yards on 423 carries and 17 touchdowns. He was awarded the Pat Tillman Award at the 2012 East–West Shrine Game.

Professional career

Carolina Panthers
Poole was signed as an undrafted free agent by the Carolina Panthers on May 11, 2012. He later spent time with the Pittsburgh Steelers and Indianapolis Colts. He signed again to the Panthers' active roster on September 27, 2014. On September 28, he made his NFL debut against the Baltimore Ravens. However, on his first career carry, he fumbled. He was released by the Panthers the next day, but re-signed with their practice squad soon after.

New Orleans Saints
The New Orleans Saints signed Poole to their practice squad on November 4, 2014. On November 20, he was released by the team.

Personal life
Tauren is the younger cousin of Jesse Poole, a former TCU Horned Frogs standout running back, and older cousin to Florida Gators recruit, cornerback Brian Poole who signed on June 13, 2011.

References

External links
Tennessee Volunteers bio

1989 births
Living people
People from Toccoa, Georgia
American football running backs
Tennessee Volunteers football players
Carolina Panthers players
Indianapolis Colts players
Pittsburgh Steelers players